Kuhestan may refer to:
 Kuhestan, Rezvanshahr, Gilan Province
 Kuhestan, Haviq, Talesh Chounty, Gilan Province
 Kuhestan-e Haviq, Talesh Chounty, Gilan Province
 Kuhestan, Kargan Rud, Talesh Chounty, Gilan Province
 Kuhestan, Kerman
 Kuhestan, Mazandaran
 Kuhestan Rural District (disambiguation)